Sir George Bowyer, 7th and 3rd Baronet DL (8 October 1811 – 7 June 1883), was a British Barrister-at-Law and Liberal politician.

Life
Born in Radley Hall in Berkshire (now Oxfordshire), he was the son of Sir George Bowyer, 6th Baronet, and Anne Hammond Douglas. Bowyer was a cadet at the Royal Military Academy, Woolwich, and was then called to the Bar by the Middle Temple in 1836. He received an honorary Master of Arts by the University of Oxford in 1839 and an honorary Doctor of Civil Laws in 1844. One year later, he changed to Lincoln's Inn. In 1860, he succeeded to both baronetcies held by his father.

Having contested Reading in the 1849 Reading by-election, Bowyer became a Member of Parliament (MP) for Dundalk from 1852 to 1868 and for Wexford County from 1874 to 1880. The Roman Catholic Church of St John of Jerusalem in Great Ormond Street in London and Our Lady and St Edmund's Church, Abingdon, were built at his own cost. He was made a Knight of Justice of the Order of Malta, a Knight Grand Cross of the Order of St. Gregory the Great and a Grand Collar of the Constantian Order of St George of Naples. Bowyer served as chamberlain to Pius IX, who appointed him a Knight of the Great Ribbon of the Order of Pius IX. He was further a deputy lieutenant of Berkshire. He was a member of the Manchester Unity Order of Oddfellows, at one time he led a procession under a banner named Loyal Bowyer Union Lodge of Odd Fellows.

Bowyer died in King's Bench Walk in London, aged 71 and unmarried. He was found dead in his bed and was buried in Radley in Berkshire on 7 June 1883. He was succeeded by his younger brother.

Works
Commentaries on Modern Civil Law (1848)
Introduction to the Study and Use of the Civil Law (1874)

Notes

References

External links 
 

 

1811 births
1883 deaths
Baronets in the Baronetage of England
Baronets in the Baronetage of Great Britain
Deputy Lieutenants of Berkshire
Knights of Malta
Knights of the Order of Pope Pius IX
Members of Lincoln's Inn
Members of the Middle Temple
People from Radley
UK MPs 1852–1857
UK MPs 1857–1859
UK MPs 1859–1865
UK MPs 1865–1868
UK MPs 1874–1880
Graduates of the Royal Military Academy, Woolwich
English Roman Catholics
Members of the Parliament of the United Kingdom for County Louth constituencies (1801–1922)
Members of the Parliament of the United Kingdom for County Wexford constituencies (1801–1922)